East Coast Bays is a football club located on Auckland's North Shore. The club has won the Chatham Cup and the NRFL Premier Division three times.

History
East Coast Bays were founded following a public meeting held at the Progressive Hall (since demolished and replaced by the Bays Club) in October 1958. The committee formed from this meeting entered four junior teams for the start of the 1959 season. As some of the committee members were supporters of Glasgow Rangers, the colours of Royal Blue shirts, white shorts, and royal Blue sox were adopted.

East Coast Bays picked The Maxwell Farm as its ground with the pitch running north to south. The old Progress Hall on the site was adapted to serve as clubrooms.

A senior side was entered the next season and with the opening of the Auckland Harbour Bridge, the area boomed and the club grew in size to more than 1000 juniors in the late seventies and early eighties. Senior sides also grew in numbers and the first team slowly made its way through the leagues, and in 1975 when the Northern League was formed they were invited to compete in the first division.

Under coach Alan Yates, the club won promotion to the National League in 1981 but was relegated the following year.

Player numbers continued to grow and Mairangi Bay simply couldn't cope with the numbers even with an additional ground at Windsor Park. This cause a breakaway of a faction of club members to form the Rangitoto club which also saw a decline in the number of junior teams.

Successive administrations lobbied the East Coast Bays Council for more grounds and at the same time new ground criteria for clubs playing in the Northern League Premier Division meant Mairangi Park was no longer suitable for playing top football. This meant that the club spent a couple of seasons using the new ground that was developed behind Rangitoto College.

Land off Anderson's Road originally designated but no longer required for a school was acquired by the council and it was agreed that the club would move there once facilities were built and grounds developed. In 1991 the club moved to its new headquarters at the newly named Bays City Park.

Since then clubroom facilities have been developed, further grounds have been obtained at Ashley Reserve. Under the direction of Willy Gerdsen, coaching pathways have been developed.

Players

First-team squad

Season to season
Source:

Honours
League
Lotto Sport Italia NRFL Premier (3): 1981, 2010, 2013
US1 Premiership (1): 2009
NRFL Division 1 (3): 1978, 1989, 2003
Cup
Chatham Cup (1): 2008

Notable players
 Lee Jones — New Zealand international
 Neil Jones — New Zealand international
 Anna Leat — New Zealand international
 Sam Malcolmson — New Zealand international
 Jacob Spoonley — New Zealand international
 Deklan Wynne — New Zealand international
 George Suri — Solomon Islands international
 Grant Young — South Africa international

References

External links
Official website
 East Coast Bays A.F.C. on NFF website

Association football clubs in Auckland
1959 establishments in New Zealand